Coins of the Australian dollar are circulated with different designs depicting various anniversaries or significant Australian events, these differing coin designs being labelled Australian commemorative coins. Typically, only the 20c, 50c, $1 and $2 coins have been minted in commemoration.

2 dollar coin
Australia's first commemorative $2 coin was released in 2012 to commemorate Remembrance Day. It features a poppy in the centre on a background of microtext, reading: "remembrance day" and "lest we forget". As Canada also has coloured circulating coins, Australia is now the second country to do so.

1 dollar coin
Not all years have issues for circulation with 1987, 1989, 1990, 1991, 1992 and 2012 only in mintpacks. Issue 1984, 1985, 1994, 1995, 1998, 2000, 2004, 2005, 2006 and 2008 are the only issue with the Kangaroo portrait, however, the 2007 $1 with the kangaroo was also minted, but only for mint sets.

50 cent coins

20 cent coin

10 cent coin

5 cent coin

References

External links

 The Australian Dollar Coin
 Circulating coinage
 Decimal coins

Australia